Hartwig (Latin Hartwicus) is a masculine given name of Germanic origin. It may refer to:
Hartwig (bishop of Passau) (died 866)
Hartwig (archbishop of Salzburg) (died 1023)
Hartwig (bishop of Brixen) (died 1039)
Hartwig (bishop of Bamberg) (died 1053)
Hartwig (abbot of Hersfeld) (died 1088)
Hartwig (archbishop of Magdeburg) (died 1102)
Hartwig I (bishop of Regensburg) (died 1126)
Hartwig II (bishop of Regensburg) (died 1164)
Hartwig, Count of Stade (1118–1168), archbishop of Bremen
Hartwig I (archbishop of Augsburg) (died 1184)
Hartwig of Uthlede (died 1207), archbishop of Bremen
Hartwig II (archbishop of Augsburg) (died 1208)
Hartwig von Grögling-Dollnstein (died 1223), bishop of Eichstätt
Hartwig I, Count Palatine of Bavaria (died 985)
Hartwig II, Count Palatine of Bavaria (died 1027)
Hartwig Altenmüller
Hartwig Bleidick
Hartwig Cassel
Hartwig Derenbourg
Hartwig Gauder
Hartwig Naftali Carlebach
Hartwig Steenken
Hartwig von Ludwiger
Hartwig von Raute